is a Japanese professional shogi player ranked 5-dan.

Promotion history
The promotion history for Shimamoto is as follows:

 6-kyū: September 1993
 1-dan: May 1997
 4-dan: April 1, 2003
 5-dan: July 12, 2011

References

External links
 ShogiHub: Professional Player Info · Shimamoto, Ryo

Japanese shogi players
Living people
Professional shogi players
Professional shogi players from Hyōgo Prefecture
People from Kobe
1980 births